Garrab-e Olya (also Romanized as Garrāb-e ‘Olyā and Garāb-e ‘Olyā) is a village in Dowlatabad Rural District, in the Central District of Ravansar County, Kermanshah Province, Iran. At the 2006 census, its population was 168, in 41 families.

References 

Populated places in Ravansar County